Mary Sanders (born 26 August 1985 in Toronto, Ontario) is an American individual Rhythmic Gymnast. Mary holds dual citizenship of both the United States and Canada, as her father was American and her mother is Canadian. She began her career representing Canada but began to compete for the USA in late 2002.  Sanders is a two-time Canadian Rhythmic Gymnastics Champion and three-time U.S.A. Rhythmic Gymnastics Champion, 4 Continents Champion, 2 time Pan American Champion and earned the title of one of the most successful Rhythmic gymnast in the Western Hemisphere, alongside Laura Zeng and Evita Griskenas

Career 
Sanders had her highest placement finishing 10th in all-around at the 2003 World Championships.

Sanders represented America in the 2004 Olympics in Athens, placing 15th in the qualifying round. She has since retired from rhythmic gymnastics and is employed by Cirque du Soleil.  Sanders performs on a freelance basis within the Special Events department of Cirque Du Soleil, but has previously toured full-time with Corteo and Delirium. Sanders is also a creative collaborator and Spokesperson for the Reebok and Cirque du Soleil JUKARI program. More recently, Sanders was one of the Creative Directors for the 2012 Kellogg’s Tour of Gymnastics Champions.

As a Rhythmic Gymnast, Sanders has ranked higher at the World Rhythmic Gymnastics Championships and Olympics than any competitor from the Western Hemisphere in history, until Laura Zeng's performance at the 2015 World Championships.

Sanders was chosen for induction into the USA Gymnastics Hall of Fame in 2009.

Sources

External links
Mary Sanders Official Website
Kellogg's Tour of Gymnastics Champions
Reebok Jukari Diary
 Mary Sanders USA Gymnastics Hall of Fame Bio
Ritmika Gymnastics Club profile

1985 births
Living people
American rhythmic gymnasts
Gymnasts at the 2003 Pan American Games
Gymnasts at the 2004 Summer Olympics
Gymnasts from Toronto
Olympic gymnasts of the United States
Pan American Games gold medalists for the United States
Pan American Games medalists in gymnastics
Competitors at the 2001 World Games
Medalists at the 2003 Pan American Games